Rybogorskaya is a rural locality (a village) in Shenkursky District, Arkhangelsk Oblast, Russia. The population was 76 as of 2010.

Geography 
Rybogorskaya is located on the Tarnya River, 42 km west of Shenkursk (the district's administrative centre) by road. Ivanovskaya is the nearest rural locality.

References 

Rural localities in Shenkursky District
Shenkursky Uyezd